Kallocain is the second studio album of the Swedish art rock band Paatos.

Track listing

CD Track Listing

 "Gasoline" (5:55)
 "Holding On" (5:00)
 "Happiness" (5:20)
 "Absinth Minded" (4:49)
 "Look At Us" (5:25)
 "Reality" (7:37)
 "Stream" (5:17)
 "Won’t be Coming Back" (5:32)
 "In Time" (6:34)

Bonus DVD Track Listing for Special Edition Only

 "Won't be Coming Back"
 "Gasoline"
 "Reality"
 "Hypnotique"

References 

2004 albums
Paatos albums
Inside Out Music albums